Ludwik Fritsche (17 August 1872 – 4 September 1940) was a Polish film actor. He appeared in more than 25 films between 1922 and 1940.

Selected filmography
 The Unspeakable (1924)
 Pan Tadeusz (1928)
 His Excellency, The Shop Assistant (1933)
 Każdemu wolno kochać (1933)
 Pieśniarz Warszawy (1934)
 30 karatów szczęścia (1936)
 Bohaterowie Sybiru (1936)
 Halka (1937)

References

External links

1872 births
1940 deaths
Polish male film actors
Polish male silent film actors
20th-century Polish male actors
People from Częstochowa
People from Piotrków Governorate